Andrzej Tomaszewicz (1943 – 11 December 2020), was a Polish historian and politician who served as a Senator.

References

1943 births
2020 deaths
Polish politicians